Archiatriplex is a genus of flowering plants belonging to the family Amaranthaceae.

Its native range is Southern Central China.

Species:

Archiatriplex nanpinensis

References

Chenopodioideae
Amaranthaceae genera